

This is a list of the National Register of Historic Places listings in Leon County, Florida.

This is intended to be a complete list of the properties and districts on the National Register of Historic Places in Leon County, Florida, United States. The locations of National Register properties and districts for which the latitude and longitude coordinates are included below, may be seen in a map.

There are 71 properties and districts listed on the National Register in the county, including 1 National Historic Landmark.  Another 3 properties were once listed, but have since been delisted.

Current listings

|}

Former listings

|}

See also

 List of National Historic Landmarks in Florida
 National Register of Historic Places listings in Florida

References

 
Leon County